The 2015 World RX of Belgium was the 3rd round of the second season of the FIA World Rallycross Championship. The event was held at the Circuit Jules Tacheny Mettet in Mettet, Wallonia.

Marklund Motorsport driver Toomas Heikkinen became the third different winner in the 2015 season, having won his semi-final as well. Second place went to defending champion, and championship leader Petter Solberg (SDRX), while the podium was completed by Reinis Nitišs, driving for the OlsbergsMSE team.

In the supporting round of the FIA European Rallycross Championship, Albatec Racing driver Jérôme Grosset-Janin took the victory, to take the lead in the drivers' championship. Grosset-Janin finished ahead of Ole Christian Veiby while Tamás Kárai was the only other finisher as he completed the podium.

The infamous incident of the damper on Alx Danielsson's Audi S3 punching open the bonnet occurred during practice.

Heats

Semi-finals

World Championship

Semi-final 1

Semi-final 2

European Championship

Semi-final 1

Semi-final 2

Finals

World Championship

European Championship

Standings after the event

World Championship standings

European Championship standings

 Note: Only the top five positions are included for both sets of standings.

References

External links

|- style="text-align:center"
|width="35%"|Previous race:2015 World RX of Hockenheim
|width="30%"|FIA World Rallycross Championship2015 season
|width="35%"|Next race:2015 World RX of Great Britain
|- style="text-align:center"
|width="35%"|Previous race:2014 World RX of Belgium
|width="30%"|World RX of Belgium
|width="35%"|Next race:2016 World RX of Belgium
|- style="text-align:center"

Belgium
World RX